State Route 88 (SR 88) is a  state highway in southern Maine, United States. This occurs in its Falmouth Foreside section.

Route description

The route is connected to US 1 directly at SR 88's two termini. It is also connected to US 1 indirectly, by a ramp, via Tuttle Road in Cumberland Foreside. Its name changes four times en route. It is Foreside Road between the southern terminus and the Yarmouth town line beside Broad Cove, at which point it becomes Lafayette Street. It then becomes East Main Street just before the Royal River's First Falls, before finishing as Spring Street.

"Herbie", New England's oldest and largest elm tree for the final thirteen years of its existence, stood on Route 88 (East Main Street) in Yarmouth, at its intersection with Yankee Drive, between 1793 and 2010.

SR 88 is mostly residential, although businesses are located on it at several points. These include (heading northward) Portland Country Club, Skillins garden center and The Dockside Grill (all in Falmouth); Town Landing Market (which was once featured in a national Coca-Cola television commercial) (Falmouth Foreside); and the Lower Falls Landing plaza (Yarmouth). Each of these examples are situated on the northbound (eastern) side of the highway.

The section of road that runs between the Pleasant Street loop in Yarmouth did not formally exist prior to the construction of Route 88. Its predecessor, the Atlantic Highway, followed Pleasant Street.

Junction list

References

External links

Floodgap Roadgap's RoadsAroundME: Maine State Route 88

088
Transportation in Cumberland County, Maine